GGR may refer to:

 Aghu Tharrnggala language
 Garowe Airport, in Puntland, Somalia
 Glucagon receptor
 Sunday Times Golden Globe Race
 2018 Golden Globe Race
 Greater German Reich, the official name of Nazi Germany between 1943 and 1945
 Greater Germanic Reich, the political entity it tried to establish during World War II
 Greenhouse gas removal, projects to remove greenhouse gases from the atmosphere and so tackle global warming
 Groudle Glen Railway, on the Isle of Man